Graaf (the Dutch word for Count) or Graaff may refer to:

People
Hannah Graaf (born 1978), Swedish glamour model and singer
Magdalena Graaf (born 1975), Swedish model, singer, and author
 Sir David Graaff, 1st Baronet (1859 –1931), South African cold storage magnate and politician
De Villiers Graaff (1913–1999), South African politician
Hansie Graaff (born 1989), South African rugby player
Jannie Graaff (1928–2015), South African welfare economist

See also
De Graaf or De Graaff, Dutch surname
De Graafschap, a Dutch football club
De Telegraaf, a Dutch newspaper
Graaff-Reinet,  fourth oldest town in South Africa
Van de Graaf (surname) , Van de Graaff''' or Van der Graaf'', Dutch surname
Van de Graaff generator, an electrostatic generator that generates very high electrostatically stable voltages
Van der Graaf Generator, an English progressive rock band

Dutch-language surnames
Dutch words and phrases